Ozan Anton Odabasi (born 8 August 1995) is a Finnish-Turkish professional basketball player for Galatasaray of the Turkish Basketbol Süper Ligi (BSL) and the EuroCup.

Odabasi grew up with the Tapiolan Honka. He moved to Fenerbahçe Ülker in summer 2012 but in 2013 he returned to Honka. He was named Korisliiga Rookie of the Year in season 2013-14, finishing with averages of 8,0 points and 3,9 rebounds per game.

He played in the Adidas Nations tournament for Team Europe in Los Angeles, 2012. He averaged 13,8 points and 8,5 rebounds per game.

Odabasi transferred from Tapiolan Honka to Helsinki Seagulls during the 2014-15 season of Korisliiga. He played 12 games in Honka before the transfer, averaging 13,3 points and 6,8 rebounds per game.

Finnish national team
He has been member of the Finnish Under-16, Under-18 and Under-20 national team. He scored team high 15,7 points per game in 2011 European U-16 Championship. Playing for Finland, Odabasi was named MVP of the FIBA Europe Under-20 Championship Division B held in 2015, where he averaged 17.7 points and 9.4 rebounds per game.

Personal life
He has a Finnish mother and Turkish father.

References

External links
  adidasnations.com
 Ozan Odabasi fibaeurope.com
 Adidas Nations netscoutsbasketball.com

1995 births
Living people
Finnish men's basketball players
Finnish people of Turkish descent
Power forwards (basketball)
Helsinki Seagulls players
Turkish men's basketball players
Sportspeople from Espoo